Darko Nišavić (May 28, 1952 in Zrenjanin–May 9, 2005) is a Serbian former wrestler who competed in the 1976 Summer Olympics where he won 4th place and in the 1980 Summer Olympics.

References

External links
 

1952 births
2005 deaths
Serbian male sport wrestlers
Olympic wrestlers of Yugoslavia
Wrestlers at the 1976 Summer Olympics
Wrestlers at the 1980 Summer Olympics
Yugoslav male sport wrestlers
Sportspeople from Zrenjanin
Universiade medalists in wrestling
Universiade silver medalists for Yugoslavia
European Wrestling Championships medalists
Medalists at the 1977 Summer Universiade
20th-century Serbian people
21st-century Serbian people